The following teams took part in the Division V tournament which was held in Sofia, Bulgaria, from March 14 to March 20. As the winner of the group, Poland was promoted to Division IV for the 2012 championships (renamed Division IIB).  Additionally Spain was elevated because of some nation's withdrawals.  Ireland, Turkey, and Bulgaria resumed play in 2013 in Division IIB Qualification.

Results

All times local (EEST/UTC+3)

Statistics

Scoring leaders 
GP = Games played; G = Goals; A = Assists; Pts = Points; +/− = Plus-minus; PIM = Penalties In Minutes

Goaltending leaders 
(minimum 40% team's total ice time)

TOI = Time on ice (minutes:seconds); GA = Goals against; GAA = Goals against average; Sv% = Save percentage; SO = Shutouts

Directorate Awards
Goaltender: Karnelia Ivanova, 
Defenseman: Vanesa Abrisqueta, 
Forward: Karolina Pozniewska,

References

External links 
 IIHF.com
 Complete results

V
2011
World